Pilisszentiván is a village in Pest county, Budapest metropolitan area, Hungary. It has a population of 4,217 (2007).

References

Economy 
The local company - Gentherm Hungary Kft. - of the Gentherm Inc. is located in the village.

Links 
Pilisszentiván's official page: http://www.pilisszentivan.hu (Hungarian)

Populated places in Pest County
Hungarian German communities